Khanda may refer to:

Places 
 Khanda, Sonipat, a very big and historical village in Sonipat district of Haryana, India
 Khanda, Jind, a village in Jind district of Haryana, India
 Khanda Kheri, a village in Hansi Tehsil of Hisar district of Haryana, India
 Khanda, Agra, a village in Agra district of Uttar Pradesh, India
 Khanda (river), Yakutia, Russia

Other uses 
 Khanda (Sikh symbol)
 Khanda (sword)

See also
 Khandan (disambiguation)
 Kandha (disambiguation)